
Year 427 BC was a year of the pre-Julian Roman calendar. At the time, it was known as the Year of the Consulship of Ahala and Mugillanus (or, less frequently, year 327 Ab urbe condita). The denomination 427 BC for this year has been used since the early medieval period, when the Anno Domini calendar era became the prevalent method in Europe for naming years.

Events 
 By place 
 Greece 
 Sparta's King Archidamus II is succeeded by his son Agis II.
 Following the surrender of Mytilene to Athens, the Athenian leader Cleon insists that the city be destroyed. In response to the pleadings of a number of Athenian citizens, Cleon's decree to destroy the population of Mytilene is reversed with only the ringleaders of the Mytilenean revolt being executed.
 Plataea surrenders to the Spartans and Thebans after its garrison comes close to death from starvation. Over 200 prisoners are put to death and Plataea is destroyed.
 The civil war in Corcyra, in which the Athenians and the Spartans have interfered ineffectually, results in a victory of the democrats (who support an alliance with Athens) over the oligarchs.
 In an effort to blockade Sparta from access to Sicilian corn, Athens responds to a plea for help from a delegation from the city of Leontini led by Gorgias, the sophist and rhetorician. Leontini is being threatened by Syracuse which is allied to Sparta. However, the Athenian mission led by the Athenian general Laches is unable to offer much help. Laches is later prosecuted by Cleon for his unsuccessful mission to support Athenian interests in Sicily.

 Roman Republic 
 The Quaestorship is opened to the Plebs.

Births 
 Plato, Greek philosopher (d. c. 347 BC)

Deaths 
 Archidamus II, king of Sparta

References